Buyeo or Puyŏ (Korean: 부여; ;  or 扶餘 Fúyú), also rendered as Fuyu, was an ancient kingdom that was centered in northern Manchuria in modern-day northeast China. It is sometimes considered a Korean kingdom, and had ties to the Yemaek people, who are considered to be the ancestors of modern Koreans. Buyeo is a major predecessor of the Korean kingdoms of Goguryeo and Baekje.

According to the Book of the Later Han, Buyeo was initially placed under the jurisdiction of the Xuantu Commandery, one of Four Commanderies of Han in the later Western Han. Buyeo entered into formal diplomatic relations with the Eastern Han dynasty by the mid-1st century AD as an important ally of that empire to check the Xianbei and Goguryeo threats. Jurisdiction of Buyeo was then placed under the Liaodong Commandery of the Eastern Han. After an incapacitating Xianbei invasion in 285, Buyeo was restored with help from the Jin dynasty. This, however, marked the beginning of a period of decline. A second Xianbei invasion in 346 finally destroyed the state, except some remnants in its core region which survived as vassals of Goguryeo until their final annexation in 494.

Inhabitants of Buyeo included the Yemaek tribe. There are no scholarly consensus on the classification of the languages spoken by the Puyo, with theories including Japonic, Amuric and a separate branch of macro-Tungusic. According to the Records of the Three Kingdoms, the Buyeo language was similar to those of its southern neighbours Goguryeo and Ye, and the language of Okjeo was only slightly different from them. Both Goguryeo and Baekje, two of the Three Kingdoms of Korea, considered themselves Buyeo's successors.

Mythical origins

The mythical founder of the Buyeo kingdom was Hae Mo-su, the Dongmyeong of Buyeo which literally means Holy King of Buyeo. After its foundation, the son of heaven (Hae Mo-su ) brought the royal court to his new palace, and he was proclaimed to be King.

Jumong is described as the son of Hae Mo-su and Lady Yuhwa who was the daughter of Habaek, the god of the Amnok River or, according to an alternative interpretation, the sun god Haebak.

History

Archaeological predecessors
The Buyeo state emerged from the Bronze Age polities of the Xituanshan and Liangquan archaeological cultures in the context of trade with various Chinese polities. In particular was the state of Yan which introduced iron technology to Manchuria and the Korean peninsula after its conquest of Liaodong in the early third century BC.

Relations with Chinese dynasties

In the later Western Han (202 BC – 9 AD), Buyeo established close ties with the Xuantu Commandery, one of Four Commanderies of Han according to the Book of the Later Han volume 85 Treatise on the Dongyi, although it proceeded to becoming a nominal tributary-state and practical ally of Eastern Han in 49 AD. This was advantageous to the Han as an ally in the northeast would curb the threats of the Xianbei in western Manchuria and eastern Mongolia and Goguryeo in the Liaodong region and the northern Korean peninsula. The Buyeo elites also sought this arrangement as it legitimized their rule and gave them better access to Han's prestige trade goods.

During a period of turmoil in China's northeast, Buyeo attacked some of Eastern Han's holdings in 111, but relations were mended in 120 and thus a military alliance was arranged. Two years later, Buyeo sent troops to the Xuantu commandery to prevent it from being destroyed by Goguryeo when it sent reinforcement to break the siege of the commandery seat. In AD 167, Buyeo attacked the Xuantu commandery but was defeated. When Emperor Xian (AD 189 – AD 220) ruled Eastern Han, Buyeo was reclassified as a tributary of the Liaodong Commandery of Han.

In the early 3rd century, Gongsun Du, a Chinese warlord in Liaodong, supported Buyeo to counter Xianbei in the north and Goguryeo in the east. After destroying the Gongsun family, the northern Chinese state of Cao Wei sent Guanqiu Jian to attack Goguryeo. Part of the expeditionary force led by Wang Qi, the Grand Administrator of the Xuantu Commandery, pursued the Guguryeo court eastward through Okjeo and into the lands of the Yilou. On their return journey they were welcomed as they passed through the land of Buyeo. It brought detailed information of the kingdom to China.

In 285 the Murong tribe of the Xianbei, led by Murong Hui, invaded Buyeo, pushing King Uiryeo (依慮) to suicide, and forcing the relocation of the court to Okjeo. Considering its friendly relationship with the Jin Dynasty, Emperor Wu helped King Uira (依羅) revive Buyeo. According to accounts in the Zizhi Tongjian and the Book of Jin, the Murong attacked the Buyeo and forced the Buyeo to relocate several times in the 4th century.

Goguryeo's attack sometime before 347 caused further decline. Having lost its stronghold on the Ashi River (within modern Harbin), Buyeo moved southwestward to Nong'an. Around 347, Buyeo was attacked by Murong Huang of the Former Yan, and King Hyeon (玄) was captured.

Fall
According to Samguk Sagi, in 504, the tribute emissary Yesilbu mentions that the gold of Buyeo could no longer be obtainable for tribute as Buyeo had been driven out by the Malgal and the Somna and absorbed into Baekje. It is also shown that the Emperor Xuanwu of Northern Wei wished that Buyeo would regain its former glory.

A remnant of Buyeo seems to have lingered around modern Harbin area under the influence of Goguryeo. Buyeo paid tribute once to Northern Wei in 457–8, but otherwise seems to have been controlled by Goguryeo. In 494, Buyeo were under attack by the rising Wuji (also known as the Mohe), and the Buyeo court moved and surrendered to Goguryeo.

Jolbon Buyeo
Many ancient historical records indicate the "Jolbon Buyeo", apparently referring to the incipient Goguryeo or its capital city. In 37 BC, Jumong became the first king of Goguryeo. Jumong went on to conquer Okjeo, Dongye, and Haengin, regaining some of Buyeo and  former territory of Gojoseon.

Culture
According to Chapter 30 "Description of the Eastern Archerians, Dongyi" in the Chinese Records of the Three Kingdoms (3rd century), the Buyeo were agricultural people who occupied the northeastern lands in Manchuria (North-East China) beyond the great walls. The aristocratic rulers subject to the king bore the title ka (加) and were distinguished from each other by animal names, such as the dog ka and horse ka.Four kas existed in Buyeo, which were horse ka, cow ka, pig ka, and dog ka, and ka is presumed to be of similar origin with the title khan. The ka system was similarly adopted in Goguryeo.

The same text states that the Buyeo language was similar to those of its southern neighbours Goguryeo and Ye, and that the language of Okjeo was only slightly different from them.
Based on this account, Lee Ki-Moon grouped the four languages as the Puyŏ languages, contemporaneous with the Han languages of the Samhan confederacies in southern Korea.

Law
Buyeo had a law that makes the thief reimburse the price that is equivalent to twelve times of the original amount the person stole, and had an eye to eye approach in terms of law.

Legacy

In the 1930s, Chinese historian Jin Yufu (金毓黻) developed a linear model of descent for the people of Manchuria and northern Korea, from the kingdoms of Buyeo, Goguryeo, and Baekje, to the modern Korean nationality. Later historians of Northeast China built upon this influential model.

Goguryeo and Baekje, two of the Three Kingdoms of Korea, considered themselves successors of Buyeo. King Onjo, the founder of Baekje, is said to have been a son of King Dongmyeongseong, founder of Goguryeo. Baekje officially changed its name to Nambuyeo (South Buyeo) in 538. Goryeo also considered itself a descendant of Buyeo through their direct ancestral ties with Goguryeo and Baekje. This is seen in their representation of palace names that were named after former kingdoms that were considered their forefathers.

See also
History of Manchuria
History of Korea
Eastern Buyeo
Galsa Buyeo
Goguryeo
Baekje

References

Bibliography
 
 
 

 
Former countries in East Asia
Former countries in Chinese history
Former countries in Korean history
494 disestablishments
Ancient peoples
History of Manchuria
2nd-century BC establishments
States and territories established in the 2nd century BC
Former monarchies of East Asia